Christoph Sonnleithner (28 May 1734 in Szeged, Hungary – 25 December 1786 in Vienna, Austria) was an Austrian jurist and composer. He was the father of Ignaz von Sonnleithner and Joseph Sonnleithner. His daughter Anna was the mother of Franz Grillparzer.

Life
Sonnleithner studied legal science at the University of Vienna where he graduated with a doctorate. Later he was given work as a solicitor in the service of the princely House of Esterházy being his employer Prince
Paul II Anton Esterházy de Galantha. Sonnleithner was appointed as Dean of the Juridical Faculty at the University of Vienna,  and had thus the office of the court judge of the Scottish Abbey, the College of the Scots.

As a composer, Sonnleithner was in contact with Joseph Haydn. He composed 36 string quartets, all dedicated to Joseph II, Holy Roman Emperor, several symphonies and various church music.

Additional information

Sources

Notes

References

Attribution
This article is based on the translation of the corresponding article on the German Wikipedia. A list of contributors can be found there at the History section.

External links
 

1734 births
1786 deaths
Musicians from Vienna
Lawyers from Vienna
Austrian male composers
Austrian classical composers
Solicitors
18th-century composers
18th-century Austrian male musicians